Dagerman Keshi (also Romanized as Degermān Keshī; also known as Degermān Kesh) is a village in Heyran Rural District, in the Central District of Astara County, Gilan Province, Iran. At the 2006 census, its population was 183, in 44 families.

Language 
Linguistic composition of the village.

References 

Populated places in Astara County

Azerbaijani settlements in Gilan Province